Thomas Berwyn Jones (13 February 1940 – 12 January 2007) was a Welsh sprint athlete, and rugby union, and professional rugby league footballer who played in the 1960s.

Background
Berwyn Jones was born in Rhymney, Monmouthshire, Wales, and he died aged 66 in Ross-on-Wye, Herefordshire, England.

Early career

Jones had a brief career in rugby union with hometown club Rhymney RFC in the South Wales Valleys, but it was in athletics that he looked set to excel until switching to rugby league.

Bronze medal at Belgrade 1962

He won the Bronze medal in the men's 4 x 100 metres relay at the 1962 European Championships in Belgrade, Yugoslavia, alongside Alf Meakin, Ron Jones and David Jones. He also won a bronze medal in the 4 x 100 metres relay while competing for Wales at the 1962 British Empire and Commonwealth Games.

British record holder

He had been touted as a potential Olympian for 1964 when he was invited to try out for Wakefield Trinity in 1964. He had been a member of the Great Britain 4 x 110 yards relay team and a British record-holder (10.3 seconds) and champion over 100 metres.

Rugby league career

Playing under the ironic alias 'A. Walker', he impressed for Wakefield Trinity in reserve team games against Huddersfield and Doncaster and soon took to the sport. Within nine months he was playing for Great Britain, and scored on his international début against France in Perpignan.

Berwyn Jones represented Other Nationalities (RL) while at Wakefield Trinity, he played  in the 2-19 defeat by St. Helens at Knowsley Road, St. Helens on Wednesday 27 January 1965, to mark the switching-on of new floodlights, represented Commonwealth XIII while at Wakefield Trinity in 1965 against New Zealand at Crystal Palace National Recreation Centre, London on Wednesday 18 August 1965, and was selected for the 1966 tour of Australia and New Zealand but did not make the Test team due to the form of Barrow's William "Bill" Burgess and Geoffrey "Geoff" Wriglesworth of Leeds.

Berwyn Jones played , i.e. number 2, and scored 2-tries in Wakefield Trinity's 18-2 victory over Leeds in the 1964–65 Yorkshire County Cup Final during the 1964–65 season at Fartown Ground, Huddersfield on Saturday 31 October 1964.

He transferred from Wakefield Trinity to Bradford Northern in 1967/68 for £3,000, where he was joined by Leeds' Geoff Wrigglesworth. The pair formed a potent right wing/centre partnership. Jones scored 26 tries that season, his best haul.

Retirement

He transferred from Bradford Northern  to St. Helens during 1969 but scored just two tries before announcing a premature retirement.

He died in January 2007 after a battle with motor neurone disease.

References

External links
!Great Britain Statistics at englandrl.co.uk (statistics currently missing due to not having appeared for both Great Britain, and England)
St Helens Profile at saints.org.uk
(archived by web.archive.org) Welsh-born Great Britain international dies
Photograph "Berwyn Jones races clear - Berwyn Jones races clear of the Doncaster cover. - 28/10/1967" at rlhp.co.uk
Photograph "Colin Dixon gets the ball away - Colin Dixon of Halifax gets the ball away despite the attention of Geoff Wrigglesworth in the Boxing Day game at Odsal. - 26/12/1967" at rlhp.co.uk
Photograph "Ken Roberts pulled down - Ken Roberts is pulled down as Berwyn Jones supports. - 23/03/1968" at rlhp.co.uk
Photograph "Going down the steps - Northern players go down the steps to take the field against Keighley. - 13/04/1968" at rlhp.co.uk

1940 births
2007 deaths
Athletes (track and field) at the 1962 British Empire and Commonwealth Games
Bradford Bulls players
Commonwealth Games bronze medallists for Wales
Commonwealth Games medallists in athletics
European Athletics Championships medalists
Footballers who switched code
Great Britain national rugby league team players
Medalists at the 1961 Summer Universiade
Other Nationalities rugby league team players
People educated at Lewis School, Pengam
Rugby league players from Rhymney
Rugby union players from Rhymney
Rugby league wingers
Rugby union wings
St Helens R.F.C. players
Universiade medalists in athletics (track and field)
Universiade silver medalists for Great Britain
Wakefield Trinity players
Welsh male sprinters
Welsh rugby league players
Welsh rugby union players
Medallists at the 1962 British Empire and Commonwealth Games